Hemant Lakhani (1935 – June 19, 2013) was an Indian-born British rice trader and sari salesman. He was convicted in 2005 of illegal arms dealing after purchasing a fake surface-to-air missile from a Russian intelligence agent posing as a disgruntled military officer, then attempting to sell that missile to an informant working for FBI and posing as a Somali terrorist.

Background
Born in Gujarat, Lakhani moved to London in 1974. Lakhani and his wife Kusum ran a number of businesses, including an export/import business Multitrade (London) Ltd and Reliance Clothing Company Ltd.

Investigations
The extent of Lakhani's background in Russia remains unknown, although one of his fellow directors in the Reliance Clothing Company is known to maintain a Moscow address. He was first noticed by the FSB in March 2003 and his past is presently being investigated by India's Central Bureau of Investigation.

It is thought that he approached the Degtyaryov Plant to purchase the missile after researching the company on the internet. Due to a tip-off from MI6, the FSB agent posed as a representative of the company to sell him a disabled Igla missile.

There is some evidence that MI6 grew interested in him after he made contact with Ukrspetsexport, an arms company suspected of supplying illegal arms to Iraq.

Criticism of American investigation
U.S. government agents were continuously involved with Lakhani's case, many claim to the point of entrapment.  It is not clear that Lakhani, before allegedly being convinced by US agents, would have wished to obtain support for terrorism.  It is also unclear whether Lakhani could ever have delivered on his promises of illegal arms to a government informant: When Lakhani was unable to obtain a missile, the U.S. government, acting through the intelligence community, provided him with one.  Such counterterrorist strategies have been described by legal scholars as window dressing, because they target supposed enemies who are so weak as not to be a threat, and divert resources from addressing real threats.

In a 2006 article in The Nation, Christopher Hayes wrote,

Lakhani's involvement with U.S. government agents and intelligence has been the subject of an episode of the public radio show This American Life, aired in 2005 and 2009.

Conviction
Lakhani was prosecuted by U.S. Attorney for the District of New Jersey Chris Christie.  He was convicted by jury in April 2005 of attempting to provide material support to terrorists, unlawful brokering of foreign defense articles and attempting to import merchandise into the U.S. by means of false statements, plus two counts of money laundering. He was sentenced to 47 years in prison, and died in 2013.

References

External links
http://news.bbc.co.uk/1/hi/world/americas/4239588.stm
https://www.theguardian.com/armstrade/story/0,10674,1018257,00.html
https://web.archive.org/web/20030820204640/http://www.njusao.org/files/la0813_r.htm
http://www.thisislondon.co.uk/news/articles/6229181?source=Evening%20Standard
http://www.thisamericanlife.org/radio-archives/episode/292/the-arms-trader
http://www.thisamericanlife.org/Radio_Episode.aspx?episode=387

1935 births
2013 deaths
Gujarati people
Indian emigrants to England
People convicted of arms trafficking
People convicted on terrorism charges
People from Gujarat
People convicted of fraud